Bizjet is the short form of business jet — a jet-powered airplane for transporting business executives.

Bizjet or variation, may also refer to:

 Hamlin Jet (ICAO airline code HJL) callsign "BIZJET", see List of airline codes (H)
 Bizjet Ltd (ICAO airline code BIZ) callsign "BIZZ", see List of airline codes (B)
 Biz Jet Charter (ICAO airline code VLX) callsign "AVOLAR", see List of airline codes (B)
 United BizJet Holding Inc, a defunct subsidiary of United Airlines (UAL Corporation)

See also

 
 
 Biz (disambiguation)
 Jet (disambiguation)